Mady Berry (14 October 1887 – 18 January 1965) was a French stage and film actress.

Selected filmography
 Gloria (1931)
 All That's Not Worth Love (1931)
 Moon Over Morocco (1931)
 The Girl and the Boy (1931)
 The Polish Jew (1931)
 Durand Versus Durand (1931)
 Amourous Adventure (1932)
 Fun in the Barracks (1932)
 Our Lord's Vineyard (1932)
 Children of Montmartre (1933)
 The Scandal (1934)
 The Typist Gets Married (1934)
 The Dying Land (1936)
 Girls of Paris (1936)
 The Flame (1936)
 The Citadel of Silence (1937)
 Arsene Lupin, Detective (1937)
 The Ladies in the Green Hats (1937)
 White Cargo (1937)
 Rasputin (1938)
 The Puritan (1938)
 The Mayor's Dilemma (1939)
 Immediate Call (1939)
 Personal Column (1939)
 There's No Tomorrow (1939)
 Radio Surprises (1940)
 Twilight (1944)
 Star Without Light (1946)
 Gates of the Night (1946)
 One Only Loves Once (1950)
 Vendetta in Camargue (1950)
 Monsieur Octave (1951)
 My Husband Is Marvelous (1952)
 A Caprice of Darling Caroline (1953)
 The Ostrich Has Two Eggs (1957)

References

Bibliography
 Waldman, Harry. Maurice Tourneur: The Life and Films. McFarland, 2001.

External links

1887 births
1965 deaths
French film actresses
20th-century French actresses